Andriy Vasylyovych Pavelko (born 7 October 1975) is a Ukrainian politician and sports functionary.

On 6 March 2015, he was elected as president of the Football Federation of Ukraine and officially replaced Anatoliy Konkov. Pavelko was already in charge as its acting president since 23 January 2015. In May 2019, he changed the federation's name to "Ukrainian Association of Football".

Political Career
In the 2010 Ukrainian local elections Pavelko he was elected a deputy of the Dnipropetrovsk City Council as number one on the list of the Front of Change and was a member of the party. He also unsuccessfully ran for the post of Dnipropetrovsk city mayor from the Front of Change. He headed the Dnipropetrovsk branch of Front of Change from 2009 to 2012.

Pavelko was placed at number 29 on the electoral list of Batkivshchyna during the 2012 Ukrainian parliamentary election.

In October 2013 Pavelko was expelled from the Batkivshchyna parliamentary faction for "not sharing the position of the faction on key issues." Pavelko did not join another faction. Late 2013 he became the leader of the political party All-Ukrainian Union "Democrats".

In the 2014 Ukrainian parliamentary election Pavelko was re-elected to parliament after being number 33 of the electoral list of Petro Poroshenko Bloc. In February 2019 his vote was registered in parliament while he himself was in Italy attending UEFA's 43rd congress.

Pavelko did not take part in the 2019 Ukrainian parliamentary election.

Achievement 
During the period of the leadership of the Ukrainian Football Association Andriy Pavelko, a number of positive developments have taken place in national football. According to Andriy Pavelko, 2019 has become the brightest in the history of Ukrainian football. Last year became unique in the biography of the national team of Ukraine: no defeat in 10 matches, including - in eight matches of the Euro 2020 qualifying cycle. The Ukraine national team triumphantly reached the 2020 UEFA European Football Championship. In addition, the U-20 youth team, led by Alexander Petrakov, won the World Cup.

Anti-corruption law 

While serving as Ukrainian MP, Pavelko initiated law No.743-VIII "On the prevention of corruption offences influence on the results of sporting competitions". The Parliament passed the law in November 2015.

In February 2023 Pavelko was suspended for a month by court as president of the Football Federation of Ukraine for possible corruption of the federation during the construction of football fields.

References

External links
 Profile at the Football Federation of Ukraine

1975 births
Living people
Politicians from Dnipro
Yaroslav Mudryi National Law University alumni
Oles Honchar Dnipro National University alumni
Front for Change (Ukraine) politicians
All-Ukrainian Union "Democrats" politicians
Independent politicians of Batkivshchyna
Petro Poroshenko Bloc politicians
Seventh convocation members of the Verkhovna Rada
Eighth convocation members of the Verkhovna Rada
Football Federation of Ukraine chairmen
21st-century Ukrainian politicians